Swingin' at the Gate is a live album led by American jazz vibraphonist Johnny Lytle which was recorded in 1967 at the Top of the Gate, an upper-story performance space above The Village Gate, for the Pacific Jazz label.

Reception

The Allmusic review by Craig Lytle states "Lytle has always made good music, and this outing is enhanced by the admirable rapport he establishes with the audience. This is an excellent piece".<ref name="Allmusic">{{Allmusic|first=Craig |last=Lytle |class=album |id=mw0000887689 |title=Swingin' at the Top of the Gate' – Review |accessdate=April 14, 2015}}</ref>

Track listingAll compositions by Johnny Lytle except as indicated''
 "Minor Soul" - 4:47
 "Gonna Get That Boat" - 5:45
 "Cherish" (Terry Kirkman) - 5:41
 "Mongo" - 4:18
 "Blues Time" - 5:30 
 "Just a Feelin' Good" - 4:25
 "When I Fall in Love" (Victor Young, Edward Heyman) - 5:12
 "Jugee Boogie" - 4:31

Personnel 
Johnny Lytle - vibraphone, xylophone, beer bottle, narration
Jimmy Foster - organ 
Larry Gales - bass
Jozell Carter - drums
Carlos "Patato" Valdes - congas

References 

1967 live albums
Johnny Lytle live albums
Albums recorded at the Village Gate
Pacific Jazz Records live albums